Johannes Fehring (1926–2004) was an Austrian composer, who worked on a number of film scores.

Selected filmography
 Ideal Woman Sought (1952)
 Emperor's Ball (1956)
 Mariandl (1961)
 Dance with Me Into the Morning (1962)
 The Merry Widow (1962)
 The Model Boy (1963)
 Don't Fool with Me (1963)
 Help, My Bride Steals (1964)
 Schweik's Awkward Years (1964)
 Call of the Forest (1965)
 In Bed by Eight (1965)

References

Bibliography
 Bergfelder, Tim. International Adventures: German Popular Cinema and European Co-productions in the 1960s. Berghahn Books, 2005.

External links

1926 births
2004 deaths
Austrian film score composers
Male film score composers
Musicians from Vienna
Austrian male composers
Austrian composers
20th-century Austrian composers
20th-century Austrian male musicians
Eurovision Song Contest conductors